Teversal is a village in the Ashfield district of Nottinghamshire, England.  The village contains ten listed buildings that are recorded in the National Heritage List for England.  Of these, one is listed at Grade I, the highest of the three grades, and the others are at Grade II, the lowest grade.  The most important listed building is a church, and all the others are houses and associated structures.


Key

Buildings

References

Citations

Sources

 

Lists of listed buildings in Nottinghamshire